The GWR Rheidol Tanks  are a fleet of  steam locomotives of the Great Western Railway design built between 1923 and 1924.  They were designed by the railway's Chief Mechanical Engineer, Charles Collett, for working services on the Vale of Rheidol Railway between Aberystwyth and Devil's Bridge.

Background

Prior to the railway grouping in 1923, the Vale of Rheidol Railway was operated by Cambrian Railways. The fleet consisted of two locomotives built by Davies and Metcalfe, supplemented by a Bagnall locomotive.

Shortly after taking control of the line, the GWR realised that the original rolling stock was in a poor state of repair. They built three new locomotives (numbered 7, 8 and 1213) at the GWR's Swindon Works. Number 1213 was later renumbered 9.

Mistaken identity

It is still possible to find references (in print, and on-line) to the mistaken belief that No. 9 is one of the original Davies & Metcalfe Locomotives, as some websites and books incorrectly perpetuate this myth, having been successfully misled by Swindon Works. The Works were very effective in their coverup, entitling the parts that made up the new No. 1213 as 'spares' in the accounts book, as the GWR Board had only given them leave to build two new locomotives (No. 7 & No. 8). A simple test to prove that No. 9 is actually of the same vintage as No. 7 & No. 8 is to compare the working drawings between it and a Davies and Metcalfe locomotive — Rheidol historian C C Green, who carried out this comparison, stated of all three current locomotives that "mechanically they are identical", and having compared the current No. 9 (the 'new' 1213) with the plans of the original 1213 stated that "no single part" of the original locomotive could possibly have fitted the new one.

In 1946, the GWR began a renumbering of the remaining locomotives inherited from pre-Grouping companies, but since it was only carried out as locomotives received heavy repairs, the process took several years. Under this scheme, the 'new' 1213 was renumbered No. 9 in March 1949.

British Rail ownership

Along with other ex-GWR locomotives, Nos. 7 and 8 retained their numbers under British Railways ownership, with no. 1213 also initially retaining its number until renumbered in 1949 under the 1946 plan. In June 1956 the three were given the names which they still carry today, being unnamed up to that point; no, 9 received the name Prince of Wales that its predecessor had borne until repainted into Cambrian Railways livery after that company absorbed the locomotive in July 1913. These three locos were the only steam engines to survive in BR's ownership after the end of main line steam traction in August 1968, excluding steam powered cranes which remained in service until 1995. Under the TOPS numbering arrangements introduced at this time they were allocated Class 98 and were nominally numbered 98007–98009, but these numbers were never actually carried on the locomotives. All three locomotives, and the rolling stock, carried standard British Rail 'rail blue' livery until the 1980s, when the locomotives were given more traditional liveries that they had carried in the past.

Conversion to oil firing

The locomotives were originally designed to burn coal, however there was a period spanning over thirty years during which the three locomotives were oil fired. Problems with sparks and unreliability of the coal supplied caused British Railways to look to alternative fuels for the locomotives. Locomotive No. 7 was the first to be converted in 1978, followed by No. 8 in 1979 and No. 9 in 1981. This change was later reversed with Locomotive No. 8 returning to coal in 2012 and No. 9 in 2013.

Preservation

All three Vale of Rheidol tanks are still in service and operating on their original route.

The standard livery is Great Western Railway green and all three locomotives currently carry this livery. The locomotives were named by British Railways in 1956 and currently do not carry their nameplates.

See also
 List of Vale of Rheidol Railway rolling stock

References

Bibliography

External links
Vale of Rheidol Railway website

Vale of Rheidol Railway
Great Western Railway locomotives
Preserved Great Western Railway steam locomotives
Preserved narrow gauge steam locomotives of Great Britain
2-6-2T locomotives